The 1952–53 Copa México was the 37th edition of the Copa México; the 10th edition in the professional era.

The competition started on February 15, 1953, and concluded on May 31, 1953, with the final match that give to the team Puebla the trophy for the second time.

Group stage

Group A

Results

Group B

Results

Championship round

Play-off

Semifinals
First Leg

Second Leg

Replay

Final

References
Mexico - Statistics of Copa México for the 1952–53 season. (RSSSF)

1952-53
1952–53 in Mexican football
1952–53 domestic association football cups